Alhama de Almería is a municipality of Almería province, in Spain, in the autonomous community of Andalusia.

Demographics

References

External links
 

Municipalities in the Province of Almería